Plain Street is a road junction near Trelights in Cornwall, England.

References

Roads in Cornwall
Transport in Cornwall